This is a list of state prisons in Pennsylvania. It does not include federal prisons or county jails located in the Commonwealth of Pennsylvania.

Historical (closed) 
 State Correctional Institution – Greensburg, Greensburg, Pennsylvania, Closed in 2013
 Eastern State Penitentiary, Fairmount, Philadelphia, Pennsylvania, Closed in 1971
 State Correctional Institution – Cresson, Cresson, Pennsylvania, Converted from a psychiatric hospital. Closed in 2013
 State Correctional Institution - Pittsburgh, Pittsburgh, Pennsylvania. Closed in 2017.
 State Correctional Institution - Retreat, Hunlock Creek, Pennsylvania, converted from a psychiatric hospital. Opened 1980. Closed June 30, 2020.
 State Correctional Institution - Graterford, Skippack Township, Pennsylvania. Closed 2018.

Young adult offenders male ages 1625

Adult female institutions

Adult male institutions

Minimum security

Medium security

Close security

Maximum security

Supermax security

Pennsylvania
Lists
Prisons